Simon David Hill (born 27 May 1968) is a Welsh International rugby union player. He made twelve appearances for his country, as well as representing Cardiff RFC and Bridgend RFC in the top division of Welsh club rugby.

Club career

Hill was brought up in Llantwit Major playing for the local school rugby team then youth rugby with Llantwit Major RFC. Whilst attending college in Yorkshire he played for Headingley and when ever home regularly turned out for the Llantwit Major senior teams.

He joined Cardiff RFC for the 1990/91 season. He remained with the club for ten seasons, making 241 appearances for the club. Amongst his achievements while at the club were Welsh Cup wins in 1994 and 1997, the Welsh league title in 1994/95 and reaching the Heineken Cup final in 1996. He moved to Bridgend RFC for the 2000/01 season. Hill made ten appearances in his one season for the club.

International career

Hill made his international test debut in May 1993, against Zimbabwe at Bulawayo as part of Wales' 1993 summer tour, a tour held concurrently with the 1993 British Lions tour to New Zealand, which featured several Welsh internationals. Hill started all three tests of the tour; a second match against Zimbabwe in Harare and a match against Namibia, scoring a try in two of the tests. His performance earned him a place in the 1994 Five Nations Championship squad, and he made his tournament début against Ireland as a substitute. Hill continued to make appearances for Wales over the next few years, participating in the 1995 and 1996 Five Nations tournaments as well as the 1995 tour of South Africa and the 1996 tour to Australia. However he was omitted from the Wales squad for the 1995 Rugby World Cup. His final cap was against England in the 1997 Five Nations Championship.

Outside rugby

Hill qualified from Cardiff School of Dentistry in 1996, and now runs a dental practice in Llantwit Major in the Vale of Glamorgan.

References

Cardiff RFC players
Bridgend RFC players
Wales international rugby union players
1968 births
Living people
Rugby union wings
Rugby union players from Cardiff